James Wesley, Rawles (born 1960) is an American author, former U.S. Army Intelligence officer, and survival retreat consultant. Rawles describes himself as a Constitutionalist Christian libertarian. He presents his name as "James Wesley, Rawles", using a comma to differentiate between the names that belong to him, and that which belongs to his family.

Early life and military career
James Wesley, Rawles was born James Wesley Rawles in California in 1960 and attended local public schools. He earned a Bachelor of Arts degree in Journalism from San Jose State University.

From 1984 to 1993, he served as a United States Army Military Intelligence officer. He resigned his commission as a U.S. Army Captain immediately after Bill Clinton was inaugurated as President of the United States.

Journalism and writing career
Rawles worked as an associate editor and regional editor (Western U.S.) with Defense Electronics magazine in the late 1980s and early 1990s Concurrently he was managing editor of The International Countermeasures Handbook.

He worked as a technical writer through most of the 1990s with a variety of electronics and software companies, including Oracle Corporation. In 2005, he began blogging full-time.

Survivalism advocate
Rawles is now a freelance writer, blogger, and survival retreat consultant.  He is the author of the survivalist novel Patriots: A Novel of Survival in the Coming Collapse, and the senior editor of SurvivalBlog.com, a blog on survival and preparedness topics.

Books
Rawles has seven books in print that are sold by mainstream booksellers: five novels and two nonfiction survival books. His second nonfiction book, titled Tools for Survival, was published in late 2014.

His novels tend to be heavy on acronyms and technical jargon, while his non-fiction books concentrate on practical skills and tools. In the Acknowledgments note to his book Tools For Survival, Rawles credits David Brin, Algis Budrys, Tom Clancy, Bruce D. Clayton, Colonel Jeff Cooper, Frederick Forsyth, Pat Frank, Gordon Dickson, Friedrich Hayek, Henry Hazlitt, Ernest Hemingway, Dean Ing, Elmer Keith, Herbert W. McBride, Ludwig von Mises, Dr. Gary North, Arthur W. Pink, John Piper, Jerry Pournelle, Ayn Rand, Lew Rockwell, Murray Rothbard, George R. Stewart and Mel Tappan as influential to his writing. In his blog, Rawles also cites Robert A. Heinlein as an influence, and often quotes him.

Patriots Novels Series

His first novel was a work of speculative fiction set in a near future including hyperinflation and socioeconomic collapse.  Initially titled: Patriots: Surviving the Coming Collapse, and later re-titled: Patriots: A Novel of Survival in the Coming Collapse. The book was originally released in draft form as shareware under the title "Triple Ought" in the early 1990s. It was released in a printed edition by Huntington House.  After Huntington House went out of business, the book was re-released by Xlibris, a "print on demand" publisher.  Starting in April 2009, the novel was published in a paperback edition by Ulysses Press.

In early April 2009, shortly after its release, it was ranked number 6 in Amazon.com's overall book sales rankings, but fell to number 33 a week later. By the end of the month it had fallen to number 98. The book's initial popularity caught librarians unprepared because it was considered a niche title and had not been reviewed by the major book review publications.  Librarians then scrambled to purchase copies of the book to meet the unanticipated demand.

The popularity of the first book spawned four sequels: Survivors: A Novel of the Coming Collapse, Founders: A Novel of the Coming Collapse, Expatriates: A Novel of the Coming Global Collapse, and Liberators: A Novel of the Coming Global Collapse.

How to Survive the End of the World as We Know It

His How to Survive the End of the World as We Know It: Tactics, Techniques, and Technologies for Uncertain Times is a non-fiction book drawn primarily from his posts on SurvivalBlog.com. The book was described as "The preppers' Bible", by a Reuters journalist. His blog addresses preparing for the multitude of possible threats toward society. Rawles describes how to prepare against a post-disaster society that suffers looting, armed violence and food shortages. He recommends establishing rural safe havens at least 300 miles from the nearest major city, financial planning for a future barter-based economy, water retrieval and purification, food production and storage, security and self-defense techniques and strategies.

The book received a mixed review from the New York Journal of Books:

For a neutral assessment of the huge efforts put in by the author, the book has its own strengths and weaknesses; however, the former outweigh the latter by a huge margin. One of its crystal clear strengths is the author's obsession with precision and a clinical eye for relevant details.

It received a favorable book review on the weblog of Orville R. Weyrich Jr. A summary of the book was published in the March–April 2010 issue of The Futurist magazine, under the headline: "Alarmingly Practical Advice For Doomsday."

Syndicated radio talk show host G. Gordon Liddy interviewed Rawles and said that his book "posits a collapse of civilization." When Rawles was interviewed by radio host Laura Ingraham, she described the book as going "through point-by-point the basics of being prepared and heightening your chances of surviving some type of major crisis."  Ingraham said that "there is a thin line between order and total anarchy in time of a crisis, when peoples' lives are on the line—and all the niceties and the rules go out the door."

How to Survive the End of the World as We Know It has 14 chapters and three appendices, 336 pages, . September 2009. First Printing (September 2009): 20,000 copies. Second Printing (October 2009): 6,000 copies. Third Printing (October 2009): 25,000 copies. An unabridged audiobook edition is also available, produced by Brilliance Audiobooks. It was narrated by Dick Hill. As of March 2011, there were 132,000 copies of the book in print, and it had gone through 11 printings. As of April 2012, there were 12 foreign publishing contracts in place to produce editions in 11 languages, and the book was still in Amazon.com's Top 250 titles, overall. The German edition, Überleben in der Krise was translated by Angelika Unterreiner and published in 2011 by Kopp Verlag. The French edition, Fin du Monde: Comment survivre? was translated by Antony Angrand. It was released in September 2012. The Spanish edition: Cómo Sobrevivir al Fin del Mundo tal Como lo Conocemos was translated by Juan Carlos Ruiz Franco in Spain and Javier Medrano in the United States. It was released in April 2012. A Romanian translation (Ghid De Supravietuir) from Editura Paralela 45 in Bucharest was released in November 2013. It was translated by Ioan Es. Pop, a well-known Romanian poet, political figure, translator, and academic.

Tools For Survival

Tools For Survival: What You Need to Survive When You're on Your Own (2014) is non-fiction book drawn primarily from Rawles's SurvivalBlog.com posts. The publisher describes the book as "a guide to the selection, use, and care of tools."  It was released on December 30, 2014, by Penguin Books, and immediately jumped to #1 in Amazon's Survival & Emergency Preparedness books category. The paperback book's ISBN is 978-0-452-29812-5. It is also sold as an e-book and audiobook.

Land of Promise
Land of Promise is the first book in the Counter-Caliphate Chronicles novel series. Released December 1, 2015, this science fiction novel is a geopolitical thriller that is a considerable departure from his previous Patriots thriller novel series.  Set in the late 2130s,  Land of Promise fictionally describes the world under the economic and military domination of a Global Islamic Caliphate, brought about by a fictional new branch of Islam, called The Thirdists.  The novel also describes the establishment of a Christian nation of refuge called The Ilemi Republic, in East Africa.  This is the first book in a planned six-novel series. It is the first release from Liberty Paradigm Publishing, a publishing venture launched by Rawles in partnership with his literary agent Robert Gottlieb of Trident Media Group.

The Ultimate Prepper’s Survival Guide
On October 20, 2020, Rawles released "The Ultimate Prepper's Survival Guide".

Philosophical, political and economic views

Rawles is an proponent of family preparedness, especially regarding food storage and advocates relocating to lightly populated rural "retreat" areas. His preparedness philosophy emphasizes the fragility of modern society, the value of silver and other tangibles for barter, recognition of moral absolutes, being well-armed, maintaining a "deep larder," relocation to rural retreats, and Christian charity. In an interview in The New York Times, Rawles identified himself as a "guns and groceries" survivalist.

Rawles interprets the 2nd Amendment as supporting citizens' individual rights to bear and keep arms. He believes they should be able to take arms to public events.

Rawles is opposed to racism, (he published a defense of his anti-racist views in a blog entry entitled "Race, Religion, and Reason" in 2010). He supports abolition of modern slavery in the world.

Rawles is opposed to military interventionism.

The Southern Poverty Law Center describes Rawles as a Christian separatist and promoter of conspiracy theories associated with the anti-government Patriot movement.

American Redoubt movement

In March 2011, Rawles formulated the American Redoubt  movement. Rawles proposes five western states (Idaho, Montana, Wyoming, eastern Oregon, and eastern Washington) as a safe haven for conservative Christians and Jews. The concept was endorsed by former Presidential candidate Chuck Baldwin, who had recently relocated his entire extended family to western Montana. One of its adherents, John Jacob Schmidt, started a weekly podcast called Radio Free Redoubt to help further the movement.

Citizen journalism facilitator
Rawles is a proponent of citizen journalism. In April 2014, along with his son Robert, Rawles co-founded The Constitution First Amendment Press Association (CFAPA), a private free press advocacy group that distributes press credentials to any literate adult U.S. Citizen, free of charge.

Secret ranch location
Rawles has lived in San Jose, California; near Orofino, Idaho; near Smartsville and Fremont, California; and near New Washoe City, Nevada. Rawles notes that the location of his ranch in the United States is kept secret, but that he lives somewhere west of the Rockies.  The German newspaper Frankfurter Allgemeine Zeitung asserts that the ranch is in northern Idaho. Others have claimed that the "undisclosed location" of the ranch is in Nevada, Utah, Wyoming or even in Central America. A CNN Europe article written before his first wife died noted that Rawles "... lives on a ranch in an undisclosed location with his wife (who he refers to in his blog affectionately as 'the Memsahib') and their children. Their life is almost entirely self-sufficient: They keep livestock, hunt elk and the children are schooled at home. Stored away in the ranch somewhere is a three-year supply of food."

In an article titled "The Most Dangerous Novel in America", Rawles told The Daily Beast: "I'm not at liberty to discuss where I live. It's part of an agreement I made with my wife. I really can't go into the details. We live in a very remote area. I embrace technology. We don't live in a cellphone area, but I'm online constantly. We're just prepared to live off-grid, if the power grid goes down. Because of the nature of my blog and my novel, I don't just want anonymity, I need anonymity. I could wake up some morning in the aftermath of some crisis and look out in my barnyard and see five Winnebagos and some television news crews. I don't want fans of my books to descend on my property, so I have to be perspicacious." In 2009, Rawles told an Agence France-Presse reporter: "I'm surrounded by national forest. A river runs through the back end of the property, so there's no shortage of water and no shortage of fish or game to shoot. If Western civilization were to collapse tomorrow, I'd have to read about it on the Internet. I just wouldn't notice." His U.S. mail address is a post office box in Newcastle, Wyoming, but his main web site server is in Sweden.

Bibliography
Rawles on Retreats and Relocation, Print on demand from CafePress, No ISBN (January 2007)
SurvivalBlog: The Best of the Blog, Volume 1, Print on demand from CafePress, No ISBN (February 2007)
 Patriots: A Novel of Survival in the Coming Collapse, Ulysses Press, Berkeley, California,  (April 2009),  (November 1998),  (December 2006)
 How to Survive the End of the World as We Know It, Plume, New York, (September 2009)
 Survivors: A Novel of the Coming Collapse, Atria Books, Simon & Schuster, (October 2011)
 Founders: A Novel of the Coming Collapse, Atria Books, Simon & Schuster, (September 2012)
 Expatriates: A Novel of the Coming Global Collapse, E.P. Dutton,  (October 2013)
 Liberators: A Novel of the Coming Global Collapse, E.P. Dutton,  (October 2014)
 Tools For Survival, Plume, New York, (December 2014)
 Land of Promise, Liberty Paradigm Publishing, Moyie Springs, Idaho, (December 2015)
 The Ultimate Prepper’s Survival Guide, Thunder Bay Press, (October 2020)

See also
 Survivalism
 Kurt Saxon
 Ragnar Benson

References

External links

 SurvivalBlog.com
 The Rawles Home Page
 James Wesley Rawles on Survival Firearms: The End of the World as We Know It at Y2KChaos

1960 births
Living people
20th-century American male writers
20th-century American non-fiction writers
20th-century American novelists
21st-century American male writers
21st-century American non-fiction writers
21st-century American novelists
Activists from California
American gun rights activists
American magazine editors
American magazine writers
American male bloggers
American bloggers
American male journalists
American male non-fiction writers
American male novelists
American military writers
American spy fiction writers
Christian libertarians
Citizen journalism
Gun writers
Non-interventionism
American opinion journalists
San Jose State University alumni
Survivalists
United States Army officers
United States Army reservists
Writers from California